Sceptea is a moth genus in the family Autostichidae. Its name comes from the Greek  meaning "to be considered".

Species
 Sceptea aequepulvella (Chambers, 1872)
 Sceptea decedens Walsingham, 1911

References

Symmocinae